Bashtery Ragel ("Buying a Man") is a 2017 Egyptian romantic comedy film, starring Nelly Karim.

Karim's character tries to conceive of a child through asking a man to do so via Facebook. Inas Lofty was the screenwriter.

Plot
The main character, Shams, runs a business. She decides to ask a man to give her a sperm donation, and to make it halal she proposes a marriage, though it is only done for the purpose of the sperm donation. Her mother is concerned about the marriage's motive being only for a business reason, but Shams becomes genuinely attracted to him, and he does with his wife. Ultimately they instead have a traditionally conceived child. France 24 stated that this is "perhaps the only ending that could make the film a success with Egyptian audiences".

Cast
 Nelly Karim: Shams Noureddine (شمس نور الدين)
  - Baghat Abu Al-Saad (بهجت أبو السعد)
 : Nagwa Youssef (نجوى يوسف)

Development
According to the screenwriter, the film was modeled after a friend who wanted to be a single mother as she wanted companionship but was uninterested in being married to a man, as she had not found good romantic relationships.

The film development team used a Facebook page purportedly of a woman asking for a sperm donation as a marketing ploy.

Lofty decided to use the romantic comedy genre to make the Egyptian public more amenable to the film's subject matter.

See also

 List of Egyptian films of 2017

References

External links
 
 
 Index of articles from Egypt Independent

2017 films
2017 romantic comedy films
Egyptian romantic comedy films